Gudisa Shentema (Amharic: ጉድሳ ሸንተማ; born 19 April 1980 in Ambo) is an Ethiopian long-distance runner who specializes in the marathon.

He won a bronze medal at the 2003 All-Africa Games and finished thirteenth at the 2005 World Championships. He also competed at the 2007 World Championships, but did not finish the race.

His personal best time is 2:07:34 hours, achieved in April 2008 at the Paris Marathon. In the half marathon his personal best time is 1:02:23 hours, achieved in September 2005 in Philadelphia.

After a two year break from the marathon distance, he made a winning return at the inaugural Haile Gebrselassie Marathon in Ethiopia.

Achievements

References

External links
 
  From Badme to Berlin...and to Osaka – Profile from Ethiopian Running Blog. Roocha.net. 24-August-2007.

1980 births
Living people
Ethiopian male long-distance runners
Ethiopian male marathon runners
Sportspeople from Oromia Region
African Games bronze medalists for Ethiopia
African Games medalists in athletics (track and field)
Athletes (track and field) at the 2003 All-Africa Games
20th-century Ethiopian people
21st-century Ethiopian people